This is a comparison between notable database engines for the MySQL database management system (DBMS). A database engine (or "storage engine") is the underlying software component that a DBMS uses to create, read, update and delete (CRUD) data from a database.

External links
 MySQL Documentation on MyISAM Storage Engine
 MyISAM's open files limit and table-cache problem explained
 The article about problems which will occur in using MyISAM

 
MySQL
MySQL